Sayyidat al-Qasr is a 1958 Egyptian romance film starring Faten Hamama and Omar Sharif. The film is directed by the Egyptian film director Kamal El Sheikh and written by Hussein Helmy Almohandes.

Plot 

Faten Hamama plays Sawsan, a middle-class orphan who meets Adel (Omar Sharif), a rich man, at an auction hall. He tries to approach her but she refuses him. As a result, he eventually marries her. His playboy friends, Shafeek and Malak (among others), feel uncomfortable with Sawsan being around, as she condemns the style of life that they lead, and therefore Adel orders her to stay at home. While staying alone at home, Sawsan works on some land Adel owns, with the help of one of Adel's old friends, Mustafa (Omar El-Hariri). Adel's playboy friends try to destroy Adel's marriage by telling him that Sawsan is having an affair with his friend, Mustafa. Adel's friends try to exploit Adel for his fortunes and convince him to sell his land. Mustafa talks to Adel and convinces him not to sell his land to his exploiter friends. Adel realizes his mistake, expels his friends, and returns to his wife.

Cast 
Faten Hamama as Sawsan
Omar Sharif as Adel
Zouzou Mady as Malak hanem
Stephan Rosti as Shafeek
Ferdoos Mohammed as the mother
Omar El-Hariri

References

External links 

1958 films
1950s Arabic-language films
Films directed by Kamal El Sheikh
1950s romance films
Egyptian romance films